Habrotrocha elegans is a species of bdelloid rotifers. It is found in moss and running water in Europe.

References

External links 
 Habrotrocha elegans at inpn.mnhn.fr
 Habrotrocha elegans at eu-nomen.eu

Animals described in 1886
Bdelloidea